A process flow diagram (PFD) is a diagram commonly used in chemical and process engineering to indicate the general flow of plant processes and equipment. The PFD displays the relationship between major equipment of a plant facility and does not show minor details such as piping details and designations. Another commonly used term for a PFD is  flowsheet.

Typical content of a process flow diagram

Typically, process flow diagrams of a single unit process will include the following:
 Process piping
 Major equipment items
Connections with other systems
 Major bypass and recirculation (recycle) streams
 Operational data (temperature, pressure, mass flow rate, density, etc.), often by stream references to a mass balance.
 Process stream names

Process flow diagrams generally do not include:
 Pipe classes or piping line numbers
 Instrumentation details
 Minor bypass lines
 Instrumentation
 Controllers like Level Control or Flow Control
 Isolation and shutoff valves
 Maintenance vents and drains
 Relief and safety valves
 Flanges

Process flow diagrams of multiple process units within a large industrial plant will usually contain less detail and may be called block flow diagrams or schematic flow diagrams.

Process flow diagram examples

The process flow diagram below depicts a single chemical engineering unit process known as an amine treating plant:

Multiple process units within an industrial plant 
The process flow diagram below is an example of a schematic or block flow diagram and depicts the various unit processes within a typical oil refinery:

Other items of interest
A PFD can be computer generated from process simulators (see List of Chemical Process Simulators), CAD packages, or flow chart software using a library of chemical engineering symbols. Rules and symbols are available from standardization organizations such as DIN, ISO or ANSI.  Often PFDs are produced on large sheets of paper.

PFDs of many commercial processes can be found in the literature, specifically in encyclopedias of chemical technology, although some might be outdated. To find recent ones, patent databases such as those available from the United States Patent and Trademark Office can be useful.

Standards
 ISO 15519-1:2010(en): Specification for diagrams for process industry — Part 1: General rules
 ISO 15519-2:2015(en): Specifications for diagrams for process industry — Part 2: Measurement and control
 ISO 10628-1:2014(en): Diagrams for the chemical and petrochemical industry — Part 1: Specification of diagrams
 ISO 10628-2:2012(en): Diagrams for the chemical and petrochemical industry — Part 2: Graphical symbols
 ANSI Y32.11: Graphical Symbols For Process Flow Diagrams (withdrawn 2003)
 SAA AS 1109: Graphical Symbols For Process Flow Diagrams For The Food Industry

See also 
 Hazop
 Piping and instrumentation diagram (P&ID)
 Symbolic language (engineering)
 Shit flow diagram

Further reading

External links

 The PFD at The Engineering Tool Box
 Kolmetz Handbook of Process Equipment Design engineering design guidelines for process flow sheets

Chemical process engineering
Piping
Diagrams
Process engineering